Colin Wringe (born 1937) is a British educational theorist and Reader in Education at Keele University, where he is an honorary fellow of the School of Social Science and Public Policy. He is best known for his works on moral education.

Books
 Developments in modern language teaching (Open Books, 1976)
 Children's rights: a philosophical study (Routledge, 1981)
 Democracy, schooling, and political education (Routledge, 1984)
 Understanding educational aims (Unwyn Hyman, 1988)
 Effective teaching of modern languages (Longman, 1989)
 Moral education: beyond the teaching of right and wrong (Springer, 2006)

References

Philosophy academics
Living people
1937 births
British educational theorists
Alumni of the UCL Institute of Education
Academics of Keele University
Philosophers of education
20th-century British male writers
20th-century British non-fiction writers
21st-century British male writers
21st-century British non-fiction writers
Alumni of the University of Oxford
20th-century British philosophers
21st-century British philosophers